Lamonte Hunley (born January 31, 1963) is a former American football linebacker. He played for the Indianapolis Colts from 1985 to 1986.

References

1963 births
Living people
American football linebackers
Arizona Wildcats football players
Indianapolis Colts players